Cyrus E. Woods (September 3, 1861 – December 8, 1938) was an American attorney, diplomat and politician.

Early life and career
He was born September 3, 1861 in Clearfield, Pennsylvania to Matthew Woods and Catheine/Katharine (Bella) Spice/Speece.  He attended Lafayette College. He later graduated from the University of Pennsylvania with a law degree in 1889.  Woods practiced law in Philadelphia and then in Pittsburgh, where he became associated with the interests of the Mellon family. On January 18, 1893, Woods married the former Mary Todd Marchand, a great-granddaughter of James Todd, former state Attorney General.

In 1900, Woods made his first bid for political office, successfully contesting the Westmoreland County-based 39th district of the Pennsylvania State Senate. He served in the Senate for two terms, from 1901 to 1907.

Diplomatic service and state appointments
Woods received his first diplomatic appointment in 1912, when President William Howard Taft named him the United States' Envoy to Portugal, with the official title of Envoy Extraordinary and Minister Plenipotentiary, as the United States had not yet elevated the post to ambassador status.

In 1915, Governor Martin Brumbaugh appointed him Secretary of the Commonwealth of Pennsylvania. Woods would serve six years in the post, before resigning in 1921 to take-up the post of Ambassador to Spain. In 1923, he moved to the post of Ambassador to Japan. During his time in Japan, he organized the American relief effort in response to the devastating 1923 Great Kantō earthquake, before resigning in 1924.

In 1929, Governor John Fisher, with whom Woods had served in the State Senate, appointed him Pennsylvania Attorney General. Woods served in the post, his final political or diplomatic appointment, for eighteen months.

Death and legacy
Woods died December 8, 1938 in Philadelphia, where he had gone for medical treatment. After his death, his widow established a foundation which became the Westmoreland Museum of American Art.

References

"Cyrus E. Woods Dies", The Washington Post, December 9, 1938, p. 6.
"Cyrus Woods Dies, Ex-Envoy in Japan", New York Times, December 9, 1938, p. 25.

External links

Profile at the U.S. Department of State
The Cyrus E. Woods Papers at Georgetown University

People from Clearfield, Pennsylvania
1861 births
1938 deaths
Pennsylvania Republicans
Secretaries of the Commonwealth of Pennsylvania
Pennsylvania Attorneys General
Ambassadors of the United States to Portugal
Ambassadors of the United States to Spain
Ambassadors of the United States to Japan
University of Pennsylvania Law School alumni
20th-century American diplomats
20th-century American politicians